In algebraic geometry, a lemniscate is any of several figure-eight or -shaped curves. The word comes from the Latin "lēmniscātus" meaning "decorated with ribbons", from the Greek λημνίσκος meaning "ribbons", or which alternatively may refer to the wool from which the ribbons were made.

Curves that have been called a lemniscate include three quartic plane curves: the hippopede or lemniscate of Booth, the lemniscate of Bernoulli, and the lemniscate of Gerono. The study of lemniscates (and in particular the hippopede) dates to ancient Greek mathematics, but the term "lemniscate" for curves of this type comes from the work of Jacob Bernoulli in the late 17th century.

History and examples

Lemniscate of Booth

The consideration of curves with a figure-eight shape can be traced back to Proclus, a Greek Neoplatonist philosopher and mathematician who lived in the 5th century AD. Proclus considered the cross-sections of a torus by a plane parallel to the axis of the torus. As he observed, for most such sections the cross section consists of either one or two ovals; however, when the plane is tangent to the inner surface of the torus, the cross-section takes on a figure-eight shape, which Proclus called a horse fetter (a device for holding two feet of a horse together), or "hippopede" in Greek. The name "lemniscate of Booth" for this curve dates to its study by the 19th-century mathematician James Booth.

The lemniscate may be defined as an algebraic curve, the zero set of the quartic polynomial  when the parameter d is negative (or zero for the special case where the lemniscate becomes a pair of externally tangent circles). For positive values of d one instead obtains the oval of Booth.

Lemniscate of Bernoulli

In 1680, Cassini studied a family of curves, now called the Cassini oval, defined as follows: the locus of all points, the product of whose distances from two fixed points, the curves' foci, is a constant. Under very particular circumstances (when the half-distance between the points is equal to the square root of the constant) this gives rise to a lemniscate.

In 1694, Johann Bernoulli studied the lemniscate case of the Cassini oval, now known as the lemniscate of Bernoulli (shown above), in connection with a problem of "isochrones" that had been posed earlier by Leibniz. Like the hippopede, it is an algebraic curve, the zero set of the polynomial . Bernoulli's brother Jacob Bernoulli also studied the same curve in the same year, and gave it its name, the lemniscate. It may also be defined geometrically as the locus of points whose product of distances from two foci equals the square of half the interfocal distance. The lemniscatic elliptic functions are analogues of trigonometric functions for the lemniscate of Bernoulli, and the lemniscate constants arise in evaluating the arc length of this lemniscate.

Lemniscate of Gerono

Another lemniscate, the lemniscate of Gerono or lemniscate of Huygens, is the zero set of the quartic polynomial . Viviani's curve, a three-dimensional curve formed by intersecting a sphere with a cylinder, also has a figure eight shape, and has the lemniscate of Gerono as its planar projection.

Others

Other figure-eight shaped algebraic curves include
 The Devil's curve, a curve defined by the quartic equation  in which one connected component has a figure-eight shape,
 Watt's curve, a figure-eight shaped curve formed by a mechanical linkage. Watt's curve is the zero set of the degree-six polynomial equation  and has the lemniscate of Bernoulli as a special case.

See also
 Analemma, the figure-eight shaped curve traced by the noontime positions of the sun in the sky over the course of a year
 Infinity symbol
 Lemniscates as generalized conics
 Lorenz attractor, a three-dimensional dynamic system exhibiting a lemniscate shape
 Polynomial lemniscate, a level set of the absolute value of a complex polynomial

References

External links

 

Mathematical terminology
Plane curves